Wolverton Public School is a former school building in Wolverton, Minnesota, United States.  It was constructed in 1906 and expanded in 1917.  It closed in 1978.  It was listed on the National Register of Historic Places in 1980 for its local significance in the themes of education and social history.  It was nominated for being one of the more architecturally consistent examples of the era's schools built for expandability as populations increased.

See also
 National Register of Historic Places listings in Wilkin County, Minnesota

References

1906 establishments in Minnesota
1978 disestablishments in Minnesota
Buildings and structures in Wilkin County, Minnesota
Defunct schools in Minnesota
Former school buildings in the United States
National Register of Historic Places in Wilkin County, Minnesota
School buildings completed in 1906
School buildings on the National Register of Historic Places in Minnesota